Laurel Canyon/Valley Village station is a station on the G Line of the Los Angeles Metro Busway system.  It is named after adjacent Laurel Canyon Boulevard, and the Valley Village district of Los Angeles, in the San Fernando Valley.

Service

Station Layout

Hours and frequency

Connections 
, the following connections are available:
 Los Angeles Metro Bus:

References

External links

LA Metro: G Line Timetable

G Line (Los Angeles Metro)
Los Angeles Metro Busway stations
North Hollywood, Los Angeles
Public transportation in the San Fernando Valley
Public transportation in Los Angeles
Bus stations in Los Angeles
2005 establishments in California